Planolites is an ichnogenus found throughout the Ediacaran and the Phanerozoic that is made during the feeding process of worm-like animals. The traces are generally small, unlined, and rarely branched, with fill that differs from the host rock.

Distribution
Planolites fossils have been found in Africa, Asia, Europe, Antarctica, and the Americas (though many more specimens have been found in North America).

Ichnospecies
Ichnospecies in Planolites include:

P. annularis Walcott, 1890
P. annularius Walcott, 1890
P. ballandus Webby, 1970
P. beverleyensis Billings, 1862
P. incipiens (Billings, 1861)
P. montanus Richter, 1937
P. reticulatus Alpert, 1975
P. serpens Webby, 1970
P. striatus (Hall, 1852)
P. terraenovae Fillion and Pickerill, 1990
P. virgatus (Hall, 1847)

See also
List of Ediacaran genera

References

Trace fossils
Ediacaran life
Fossils of Antarctica
Fossils of Argentina
Fossils of Austria
Fossils of Canada
Paleozoic life of British Columbia
Paleozoic life of Newfoundland and Labrador
Paleozoic life of Quebec
Fossils of China
Fossils of the Czech Republic
Fossils of Denmark
Fossils of Egypt
Fossils of France
Fossils of Germany
Fossils of Greenland
Fossils of India
Fossils of Kazakhstan
Fossils of Mexico
Fossils of Morocco
Fossils of Norway
Fossils of Poland
Fossils of Russia
Fossils of Spain
Fossils of South Africa
Fossils of Switzerland
Fossils of Tunisia
Fossils of Great Britain
Fossils of the United States
Fossil taxa described in 1873